George Thomas Whitten (26 June 1922 – 28 June 2001) was an Australian politician who represented the South Australian House of Assembly seat of Price for the Labor Party from 1975 to 1985.

References

 

Members of the South Australian House of Assembly
2001 deaths
1922 births
Australian Labor Party members of the Parliament of South Australia
20th-century Australian politicians